In geometry, the Nagel point (named for Christian Heinrich von Nagel) is a triangle center, one of the points associated with a given triangle whose definition does not depend on the placement or scale of the triangle. It is the point of concurrency of all three of the triangle's splitters.

Construction
Given a triangle , let  be the extouch points in which the -excircle meets line , the -excircle meets line , and the -excircle meets line , respectively.  The lines  concur in the Nagel point  of triangle .

Because of this construction, the Nagel point is sometimes also called the bisected perimeter point, and the segments  are called the triangle's splitters.

There exists an easy construction of the Nagel point.  Starting from each vertex of a triangle, it suffices to  carry twice the length of the opposite edge. We obtain three lines which concur at the Nagel point.

Relation to other triangle centers 
The Nagel point is the isotomic conjugate of the Gergonne point. The Nagel point, the centroid, and the incenter are collinear on a line called the Nagel line. The incenter is the Nagel point of the medial triangle; equivalently, the Nagel point is the incenter of the anticomplementary triangle. The isogonal conjugate of the Nagel point is the point of concurrency of the lines joining the mixtilinear touchpoint and the opposite vertex.

Barycentric coordinates 
The un-normalized barycentric coordinates of the Nagel point are  where  is the semi-perimeter of the reference triangle .

Trilinear coordinates 
The trilinear coordinates of the Nagel point are as

or, equivalently, in terms of the side lengths

History
The Nagel point is named after Christian Heinrich von Nagel, a nineteenth-century German mathematician, who wrote about it in 1836.
Early contributions to the study of this point were also made by August Leopold Crelle and Carl Gustav Jacob Jacobi.

See also 
 Mandart inellipse
 Trisected perimeter point

References

External links
 Nagel Point from Cut-the-knot
 Nagel Point, Clark Kimberling
 
 Spieker Conic and generalization of Nagel line at Dynamic Geometry Sketches Generalizes Spieker circle and associated Nagel line.

Triangle centers

fr:Cercles inscrit et exinscrits d'un triangle#Point de Nagel